WD 0810-353 (UPM J0812-3529) is a white dwarf currently located  from the Solar System.

Observations
WD 0810-353 is a dim object with an apparent magnitude of 14.5 in the southern constellation of Puppis. Its motion perpendicular to the line of sight is considerable; it is consistently listed as a high proper motion star.

Physical properties

Flyby
Considering the values from Gaia DR3, WD 1810-353 will traverse the Oort cloud, disturbing the population of comets there. Both the minimum approach distance and the timing of this flyby depend strongly on the value of the radial velocity. The Gaia DR3 mean BP/RP low-resolution spectrum suggests that WD 0810-353 could be a hypervelocity runaway white dwarf ejected during a type Ia supernova explosion. Extensive analyses show that the relative velocity during the flyby could be high enough, or the minimum approach distance large enough, to prevent any significant perturbation on the Oort cloud.

Notes

References

White dwarfs
Puppis